Bartons Creek Township (also designated Township 2) is one of twenty townships within Wake County, North Carolina,  United States. As of the 2010 census, Bartons Creek Township had a population of 22,055.

The township occupies  in the northwestern corner of Wake County, including portions of the city of Raleigh.

The township is bounded by the border with Durham County, Old Creedmoor Rd, Baileywick Rd, Creedmoor Rd, Strickland Rd, Falls of Neuse Rd, the Neuse River, and Falls Lake.  The community of Falls is located partially within the township.  Notable features include the Mountains-to-Sea Trail, Falls Lake State Recreation Area, and Blue Jay Point County Park.  The entire township is within the Falls Lake watershed.  I-540 goes through the southern portion of the township.

References

Townships in Wake County, North Carolina
Townships in North Carolina
Populated places on the Neuse River